Jahangerd (also Romanized as Jahāngerd; also known as Jahālgard) is a village in Donbaleh Rud-e Shomali Rural District, Dehdez District, Izeh County, Khuzestan Province, Iran. At the 2006 census, its population was 48, in 7 families.

References 

Populated places in Izeh County